Sevenoaks Rural District was a rural district in the county of Kent, England, from 1894 to 1974. It did not include Sevenoaks Urban District, which covered the town of Sevenoaks. It was created in 1894 from the majority of the area of Somerden Hundred, and parts of the Hundreds of Codsheath, Brasted, and Westerham and Edinbridge.

It included the following civil parishes:

Brasted
Chevening
Chiddingstone
Cowden
Dunton Green (1909–1974; created from part of Otford parish)
Edenbridge
Halstead
Hever
Kemsing
Knockholt (1969–1974; gained from London Borough of Bromley in Greater London)
Leigh
Otford
Penshurst
Riverhead
Seal
Sevenoaks Weald
Shoreham
Sundridge
Westerham

The rural district was abolished in 1974 and its former area is now part of the Sevenoaks district.

References

Districts of England abolished by the Local Government Act 1972
Districts of England created by the Local Government Act 1894
History of Kent
Sevenoaks
Rural districts of England